Scale models of the Bastille were produced between 1789 and 1790 by the businessman Pierre-François Palloy using stones from the demolition of the Bastille, the building they portray.

History
Following the fall of the Bastille on 14 July 1789 Palloy decided to take charge of its demolition, gaining official authorisation to do so on 16 July and completing work on 21 May 1791. Stones from the former fortress were used on several building projects, notably Pont de la Concorde, but Palloy also converted salvaged stones and other materials into souvenirs, such as stone plaques made from stones from the dungeons, medals made from chains and so on, thus launching a fashion for representations of the fall.

When the 83 départements were founded at the end of 1789 Palloy decided to make a scale model of the Bastille from its stones for each of the départements' capitals. He set up a studio dedicated to producing them, initially carved from the stones, then mass-produced by casting a mix of stone powder and mortar. He offered the scale models to the départements at the end of 1790, sending with them other products and an "apostle of Liberty" (an association set up by Palloy himself), who would give a speech when the gifts were handed over. Scale models were also offered to government ministers, to Louis XVI and to foreign dignitaries such as George Washington (his is still on display at Mount Vernon). 

The scale models were around 40 cm high, 100 cm wide and 60 cm deep and were presented to the public at patriotic festivals and contributed to turning the Bastille's fall into a republican myth and symbol of liberty/

Surviving examples 

Surviving examples include :
 Auch : Archives départementales du Gers
 Chartres : Musée des beaux-arts de Chartres 
 Nancy : Musée lorrain (Palais des Ducs de Lorraine)
 Nantes  : Musée Dobrée 
 Pau : Archives départementales des Pyrénées-Atlantiques.
 Paris : musée Carnavalet
 Paris : Musée des Archives nationales
 Quimper : Musée départemental breton
 Le Puy-en-Velay : musée Crozatier
 Rouen : musée départemental des antiquités
 Tours : hôtel Goüin
 Tulle: garden of the museum cloister
 Valence :  musée des beaux-arts
 Vannes : Archives départementales du Morbihan
 Versailles : salle du Jeu de paume
 Vizille : salle de l'été 1789, musée de la Révolution française
 Saint-Brieuc : musée d'art et d'histoire de Saint-Brieuc (not on display)
 Coutances : Musée Quesnel-Morinière

Bibliography
 Jean-Pierre Babelon, 'Les maquettes et les pierres de la Bastille. Récolement des souvenirs lapidaires provenant de l'activité du patriote Pallo', La Gazette des archives, 1965

References

Collections of the Musée Carnavalet
Bastille
Scale modeling